Meslalla (cracked green olive,) is a Moroccan green olive cultivar used for olive oil production. It is often used to pickle garlic and hot peppers, and is also used in tagines.

References

Moroccan cuisine
Olive cultivars